Alberto Iribarne (born 2 August 1950) is an Argentinian lawyer, who was Minister of Justice during the presidency of Néstor Kirchner from 2005 and 2007.

He was born in Buenos Aires. He was designated by president Cristina Fernández de Kirchner as Ambassador of Argentina to the Holy See but his diplomatic approval was refused by the Vatican. According some reports, it was because he is divorced. In 2019 Iribarne was designated the Ambassador to Uruguay by President Alberto Fernández.

He is graduated at law from University of Buenos Aires.

References

1950 births
Living people
Lawyers from Buenos Aires
20th-century Argentine lawyers